Brekke is a former municipality in the old Sogn og Fjordane county, Norway. The municipality has existed two separate times: from 1850 until 1861 and then again from 1905 until its dissolution in 1964. It was located in the northeastern part of the present-day Gulen Municipality in Vestland county. The administrative center of the municipality  was the village of Brekke, located on the southern shore of the Sognefjord, about a  drive from the village of Eivindvik. The main church for the municipality was Brekke Church.

Name
The municipality is named after the old Brekke farm since Brekke Church was located there.  The name is identical to the old Norwegian word meaning "slope". Historically, the spelling of the name was not formalized, so spellings such as Breche, Bræcke, and Brække were also used.

History
The parish of Brekke was originally established as a municipality in 1850 when it was split off from the municipality of Evindvig. Initially, Brekke had a population of 898.  In 1861, Brekke (population: 898) was merged with neighboring municipality of Lavik (population: 926) to form the new municipality of Lavik og Brekke. On 1 January 1875, a part of Klævold municipality with 90 inhabitants was moved to Lavik og Brekke.

On 1 January 1905, the municipality of Lavik og Brekke was split (back) into two parts, Lavik (population: 1,182) and Brekke (population: 982). During the 1960s, there were many municipal mergers across Norway due to the work of the Schei Committee. On 1 January 1964, Brekke municipality ceased to exist when it was merged with Gulen, the neighboring municipality to the west, forming a new, larger municipality of Gulen. Before the merger, Brekke had a population of 782.

Government

Municipal council
The municipal council  of Brekke was made up of 13 representatives that were elected to four year terms.  The party breakdown of the final municipal council was as follows:

Notable residents
The Communist and anti-Nazi Resistance leader Peder Furubotn was born in Brekke in 1890.

See also
List of former municipalities of Norway

References

External links

Weather information for Brekke 
Map of the Municipality of Brekke

Gulen
Former municipalities of Norway
1850 establishments in Norway
1861 disestablishments in Norway
1905 establishments in Norway
1964 disestablishments in Norway